The Great Leap is a 1927 German silent comedy film directed by Arnold Fanck and starring Leni Riefenstahl, Luis Trenker and Hans Schneeberger. A young Italian girl living in the Dolomites falls in love with a member of a tourist party skiing on the nearby mountains.

Cast
 Leni Riefenstahl as Gita 
 Luis Trenker as Toni 
 Hans Schneeberger as Michael Treuherz 
 Paul Graetz as Paule

References
Notes

Bibliography

 Riefenstahl, Leni (1995) A Memoir NY Picador USA  pg 60-62
 Hinton, David B. (2000) The Films of Leni Riefenstahl Scarecrow Press  pg 7
 Rother, Rainer (2003) Leni Riefenstahl: The Seduction of Genius Continuum  
 Salkeld, Audrey (2011) A Portrait Of Leni Riefenstahl Random House  pg 50-51

External links
 
 Paul Graetz as Diener Paul http://www.walter-riml.at/welcome/photogallery/1927-gita-the-goat-girl/
  Luis Trenker http://www.walter-riml.at/welcome/1927-gita-the-goat-girl/
  Leni Riefenstahl http://www.walter-riml.at/welcome/1927-gita-the-goat-girl/

1927 films
1927 comedy films
Films of the Weimar Republic
German silent feature films
German adventure comedy films
Films directed by Arnold Fanck
Mountaineering films
Skiing films
Films set in Italy
Films set in the Alps
German black-and-white films
UFA GmbH films
1920s German-language films
Silent adventure comedy films
1920s German films